Casarabe is a village in the Beni Department of northern Bolivia.

References

Populated places in Beni Department